Odites balanospila is a moth in the family Depressariidae. It was described by Edward Meyrick in 1930. It is found in Sierra Leone.

The wingspan is about 17 mm. The forewings are whitish ochreous with the costa slenderly infuscated from near the base to three-fourths. There is a small elongate rather dark brown spot in the disc before the middle, both extremities somewhat extended by slight streaks of brownish suffusion. There is also an irregular brownish apical spot sprinkled dark fuscous and a few dark fuscous specks on the termen. The hindwings are ochreous whitish.

References

Moths described in 1930
Odites
Taxa named by Edward Meyrick